= Aralihonda =

- Village
- Country: India
- State: Karnataka
- District: Dharwad

Government
  - Type: Panchayat raj
  - Body: Gram panchayat

Population (2011)
  - Total: 841

Languages
  - Official: Kannada
- Time zone: UTC+5:30 (IST)
- ISO 3166 code: IN-KA
- Vehicle registration: KA
- Website: karnataka.gov.in

Aralihonda is a village in Dharwad district of Karnataka, India.

== Population ==
The 2011 Census in India reported the population was 841 in 2011.

Total	Total # of Houses	Female %	Total Literacy rate %	Female Literacy rate	Scheduled Tribes %	Scheduled Caste %	Working Population %	Child (0–6)	Female Child (0–6) %
841	157	48.0 % (404)	54.7 % (460)	23.4 % (197)	1.1 % (9)	17.4 % (146)	54.8 %	108	50.9 % (55)

== See also ==
List of villages in India
